Hans Georg Calmeyer (23 June 1903 – 3 September 1972) was a German lawyer from Osnabrück who saved thousands of Jews from certain death during the German occupation of the Netherlands from 1941 until 1945. On 4 March 1992 Yad Vashem recognized Hans Calmeyer as Righteous Among the Nations.

, historians at Yad Vashem are presently looking into newly uncovered evidence suggesting that Calmeyer also helped send more than 500 people directly into death camps during the Dutch occupation.

Early life

Calmeyer studied Law in Freiburg, Marburg and Munich. In 1923, as a member of the Reichswehr, he took part in Hitler’s attempted Putsch. Later, he opened his law practice in Osnabrück where he enjoyed an excellent reputation as a lawyer.

In 1933, his license to practice law was revoked because of his activity and leaning towards Communist lines of thought. Ten months later, his license was reinstated. He was a member of the Federation of the National Socialist German Lawyers, but not the Nazi party.

Nazi occupation
In 1940, Calmeyer, serving as a soldier and a member of an aerial defense intelligence unit, took part in the invasion of the Netherlands by the German Army. In 1941, he was active in the Reichs Commissioner's Office (Reichskommissariat), which was in charge of all occupied districts in the Netherlands. While there, Calmeyer was appointed Director for the Interior Administration, which also handled 'Jewish affairs', thus enabling Calmeyer, as an administrative lawyer, to clear "racially ambiguous" Jewish cases for the German occupational administration in The Hague.

Unlike policy in Germany, people of Jewish descent could rebut being registered as "full blooded Jews" by documenting and proving ancestry through word of mouth and birth certificates to qualify as "half-Jewish", "quarter-Jewish", or of Aryan descent. Calmeyer described in his own words, how he used his position: "To build a lifeboat." He accepted falsified papers of ancestry which documented the subject person as Aryan or "half-Jewish". He also managed to offer hints and advice on various stratagems and excuses. Despite warnings from the Nazi regime, he persisted in his work.

Approximately 5,660 individuals submitted a request and were designated as doubtful cases through Calmeyer’s office. Of them at least 3,700 were spared deportation and certain death. Yet the decisions on "dubious cases" concerning the remaining about 1,960 individuals were the equivalent of a death sentence: they shared the fate of 107,000 out of the 140,000 Jews living in the Netherlands, who were transported by the Germans to various concentration camps for extermination, most notably Auschwitz-Birkenau and Sobibor. Only approximately 5,200 people survived the deportation to these camps.

Legacy and later controversy
According to a description of Calmeyer by the German Bundespresident Johannes Rau: "Calmeyer joined the ranks of human beings who helped, but who were also guilty of being caught up in the unjustifiable wrongdoings of the regime". His work was almost forgotten until a movement to honor him came about during the 1980s. On 4 March 1992, Yad Vashem honored Hans Calmeyer posthumously with the title "A Righteous Man Among Nations". On 2 January 1995 the town of Osnabrück awarded Calmeyer its highest award posthumously: "The Moesermedaille". Present at the ceremony were his son, Dr. Peter Calmeyer, and the Ambassador of Israel, Avi Primor.

In later years, up to 2020, Calmeyer's heroism has been questioned and challenged by some researchers. One 92-year-old Holocaust survivor who challenged his honors said that he had her sent to Auschwitz and  threatened to have her non-Jewish Catholic father deported. In a book and a television documentary aired by the Jewish Programming division of the EO broadcaster in the Netherlands, Holocaust survivor Femma Fleijsman says Calmeyer rejected an appeal she made and sent her to Bergen-Belsen.

A petition to the German embassy in The Hague was made against plans for a German museum to name a building after Calmeyer. Historian Petra van den Boomgaard says she understands the controversy but says that "Calmeyer did help many Jews, and there is a large group of people who attribute their survival to him and who are still very grateful to him for this. Until September 1943 there was a real chance of a request for revision being granted, but after that Calmeyer came under pressure. He was betrayed several times by Dutch parties involved in the review process during that period."

There is ongoing research into the question as to why Calmeyer didn't approve more requests. Journalist Hans Knoop says "Calmeyer honored about 2,500 objections, but also rejected around 1,500. He just performed official work and never did anything outside the lines, he was never in danger." Others say that the SS got suspicious of Calmeyer and that he was being watched, putting him in a desperate position where he was forced to choose which persons to save.

Further reading

References

Joachim Castan/Thomas (Hg): Hans Calmeyer and the Rescue of the Jews in the Netherlands;
Catalogue for the exhibition, same title.  Goettingen: V& Runipress 2003.  (optimal introduction of the topic.)

External links
 Hans Georg Calmeyer – his activity to save Jews' lives during the Holocaust, at Yad Vashem website

1903 births
1972 deaths
People from Osnabrück
People from the Province of Hanover
Collaborators who participated in the Beer Hall Putsch
20th-century Freikorps personnel
National Socialist Motor Corps members
German Righteous Among the Nations
University of Freiburg alumni
University of Marburg alumni
Ludwig Maximilian University of Munich alumni
20th-century German lawyers